Goshen is an unincorporated community in Mercer County, in the U.S. state of Missouri.

History
Goshen was originally called McKinneysville, and under the latter name was platted in 1860. A post office called Goshen was established in 1854, and remained in operation until 1904. The community derives its name from the Land of Goshen, a place mentioned in the Hebrew Bible.

References

Unincorporated communities in Mercer County, Missouri
Unincorporated communities in Missouri